Doctor Detective is a Thai television series produced by Magic Eve One Entertainment. The series is based on a novel by Piyaporn Wayuparp, and the cast includes Nadech Kugimiya, Kimberley Anne Woltemas, Purita Suphinchumphu and Alex Rendell along with Nipaporn Thitithanakarn, Wisarut Hiranbut, Nopphawit Thaitae, Sanya Kunakorn, Songsit Roongnophakunsri, Kwanruedee Klomklom, Polwat Manuprasert, Sarut Wichitranond and Niti Chaichitathorn.

Production 
Doctor Detective made a fitting for the cast's clothes on Thursday, March 24, 2022, with Nithiwat Cholvanichsiri as the director of the drama.

Phiyada Jutharattanakul, the producer of the drama, said that it was based on the current epidemic situation.  The series is intended to let viewers know more about the profession of doctors, and each character will have different clues. Until Monday, October 10, 2022, the first teaser trailer for Doctor Detective was released along with other dramas. And the last queue was filmed on Sunday, February 26, 2023, which is expected to be broadcast in the second half of the year.

Cast

References 

Thai drama television series